The Trade Union International of Textile, Leather and Fur Workers Unions was a trade union international affiliated with the World Federation of Trade Unions.

History 
The Trade Union International of Textile, Leather and Fur Workers Unions was formed in 1958 when the TUIs of Leather, Shoe, Fur and Leather Products and of Textile and Clothing Workers merged. Both of the earlier organizations were founded in 1949.

In 1997 the Trade Union International of Agroalimentary, Food, Commerce, Textile & Allied Industries was formed by the merger of the Trade Union International of Agricultural, Forestry and Plantation Workers, Trade Union International of Food, Tobacco, Hotel and Allied Industries Workers, Trade Union International of Workers in Commerce, Trade Union International of Textile, Leather and Fur Workers Unions.

Organization 
The TUI had a controlling congress, directing committee, bureau and permanent secretariat.

In 1978 its address was listed as Opletova 57 Prague, 1 an address it would keep until at least 1991.

It cooperated on a regional level with the Latin American Federation of Textile, Clothing and Leather Workers, the Arab Federation of Textile Workers and the Organization of African Trade Union Unity.

Membership 

In 1976 the TUI claimed affiliates in 29 countries. In 1985 it had 75 organizations in 58 countries representing 29 million members.

Publications 

It published the periodicals Courier and News.

Leadership

General Secretaries
1958: Jaroslav Mevald
Zdenek Spicka
1979: Jan Kriz
1987: Jan Hübner
1990: Evgeni Sidorov

Presidents
1958: Teresa Noce
c.1960: Lina Fibbi

Gilberto Morales

See also 

International Textile, Garment and Leather Workers' Federation

References 

Trade unions established in 1958
1997 disestablishments
Trade unions disestablished in 1997
Textile
Textile and clothing trade unions
TUI of Agriculture, Food, Commerce, Textile and Allied Industries
Defunct transnational trade unions